Andrey Morkovin (born April 9, 1985) is an Uzbek former swimmer, who specialized in breaststroke events. Morkovin qualified for the men's 200 m breaststroke at the 2004 Summer Olympics in Athens, by clearing a FINA B-cut of 2:18.76 from the Russian Open Championships in Moscow. He challenged seven other swimmers in heat two, including dual citizen Mihail Alexandrov of Bulgaria. He raced to fifth place by seven tenths of a second (0.70) behind Algeria's Sofiane Daid in 2:18.48. Morkovin failed to advance into the semifinals, as he placed thirty-fourth overall in the preliminaries.

References

1985 births
Living people
Sportspeople from Tashkent
Uzbekistani male breaststroke swimmers
Olympic swimmers of Uzbekistan
Swimmers at the 2004 Summer Olympics
Swimmers at the 2006 Asian Games
Asian Games competitors for Uzbekistan
21st-century Uzbekistani people